The 2018–19 Milwaukee Bucks season was the 51st season of the franchise in the National Basketball Association (NBA). The Bucks moved from the Bradley Center to the new Fiserv Forum before the start of the season. On May 17, 2018, the Bucks hired Mike Budenholzer as head coach. The Bucks opened the season with seven straight wins, the first time they started a season 7–0 since 1971–72. On March 1, 2019, with a 131–120 victory over the Los Angeles Lakers, the Bucks became the first team to secure a playoff berth in the season. Later on, The Bucks clinched their first Division Championship since 2000-01. They then clinched the best record in the NBA with a win against the Philadelphia 76ers on April 4, 2019, achieving the feat for the first time since 1973–74. Eventually, the Bucks finished the regular season with a 60–22 record, the franchise's first 60-win season since 1980–81. The Bucks finished 33–8 at home, the second-best home record in the NBA, behind the Denver Nuggets, and their 27–14 road record was the best in the league, tied with the Golden State Warriors. The Bucks also won all 14 of their season series against Eastern Conference opponents, and lost back-to-back games just once, resulting in their longest losing streak for the season, at two games. The Bucks had the best team defensive rating in the NBA.

In the playoffs, the Bucks defeated the Detroit Pistons in the First Round by a four-game sweep, winning their first playoff series since 2001. The Bucks then defeated the Boston Celtics in the Semifinals in five games, advancing to the Eastern Conference Finals for the first time since 2001, where they faced the Toronto Raptors and lost to the eventual NBA Champion in six games, despite taking the first two.

Giannis Antetokounmpo was named league MVP after this season and he and Khris Middleton were voted to play in the 2019 NBA All-Star Game. Also, following the season Malcolm Brogdon, who won Rookie of the Year in 2017, left the team in free agency for the Indiana Pacers after just three years with the Bucks.

Draft picks

Roster

<noinclude>

Standings

Division

Conference

Game log

Preseason

|- style="background:#bfb"
| 1
| October 3
| Chicago
| 
| Giannis Antetokounmpo (19)
| Giannis Antetokounmpo (13)
| Bledsoe, DiVincenzo, Frazier (6)
| Fiserv Forum15,107
| 1–0
|- style="background:#bfb"
| 2
| October 7
| @ Minnesota
| 
| Giannis Antetokounmpo (21)
| Giannis Antetokounmpo (10)
| Tim Frazier (5)
| Hilton Coliseum11,603
| 2–0
|- style="background:#fcc"
| 3
| October 9
| @ Oklahoma City
| 
| Christian Wood (19)
| Christian Wood (15)
| Malcolm Brogdon (7)
| Chesapeake Energy Arena18,203
| 2–1
|- style="background:#bfb"
| 4
| October 12
| Minnesota
| 
| Giannis Antetokounmpo (32)
| Giannis Antetokounmpo (12)
| Giannis Antetokounmpo (10)
| Fiserv Forum14,724
| 3–1

Regular season

|- style="background:#cfc
| 1
| October 17
| @ Charlotte
| 
| Giannis Antetokounmpo (25)
| Giannis Antetokounmpo (18)
| Giannis Antetokounmpo (8)
| Spectrum Center17,889
| 1–0
|- style="background:#cfc
| 2
| October 19
| Indiana
| 
| Giannis Antetokounmpo (26)
| Giannis Antetokounmpo (15)
| Bledsoe, Brogdon (7)
| Fiserv Forum17,341
| 2–0
|- style="background:#cfc
| 3
| October 22
| New York
| 
| Giannis Antetokounmpo (31)
| Giannis Antetokounmpo (15)
| Eric Bledsoe (13)
| Fiserv Forum16,228
| 3–0
|- style="background:#cfc
| 4
| October 24
| Philadelphia
| 
| Giannis Antetokounmpo (32)
| Giannis Antetokounmpo (18)
| Giannis Antetokounmpo (10)
| Fiserv Forum17,341
| 4–0
|- style="background:#cfc
| 5
| October 26
| @ Minnesota
| 
| Middleton, Ilyasova (16)
| Giannis Antetokounmpo (12)
| Eric Bledsoe (9)
| Target Center16,334
| 5–0
|- style="background:#cfc
| 6
| October 27
| Orlando
| 
| Giannis Antetokounmpo (21)
| Ersan Ilyasova (10)
| Ersan Ilyasova (6)
| Fiserv Forum17,341
| 6–0
|- style="background:#cfc"
| 7
| October 29
| Toronto
| 
| Ersan Ilyasova (19)
| Ersan Ilyasova (10)
| Middleton, Bledsoe (8)
| Fiserv Forum17,341
| 7–0

|- style="background:#fcc"
| 8
| November 1
| @ Boston
| 
| Giannis Antetokounmpo (33)
| Giannis Antetokounmpo (11)
| Eric Bledsoe (7)
| TD Garden18,624
| 7–1
|- style="background:#cfc"
| 9
| November 4
| Sacramento
| 
| Giannis Antetokounmpo (26)
| Giannis Antetokounmpo (15)
| Giannis Antetokounmpo (11)
| Fiserv Forum17,341
| 8–1
|- style="background:#fcc"
| 10
| November 6
| @ Portland
| 
| Giannis Antetokounmpo (23)
| Antetokounmpo, Ilyasova (9)
| Eric Bledsoe (7)
| Moda Center19,512
| 8–2
|- style="background:#cfc"
| 11
| November 8
| @ Golden State
| 
| Eric Bledsoe (26)
| Giannis Antetokounmpo (9)
| Middleton, Bledsoe (6)
| Oracle Arena19,596
| 9–2
|- style="background:#fcc"
| 12
| November 10
| @ L.A. Clippers
| 
| Giannis Antetokounmpo (27)
| Giannis Antetokounmpo (18)
| Middleton, Bledsoe, Connaughton (5)
| Staples Center17,486
| 9–3
|- style="background:#cfc"
| 13
| November 11
| @ Denver
| 
| Brook Lopez (28)
| Giannis Antetokounmpo (9)
| Giannis Antetokounmpo (8)
| Pepsi Center19,520
| 10–3
|- style="background:#fcc"
| 14
| November 14
| Memphis
| 
| Giannis Antetokounmpo (31)
| Giannis Antetokounmpo (9)
| Eric Bledsoe (7)
| Fiserv Forum16,817
| 10–4
|- style="background:#cfc"
| 15
| November 16
| Chicago
| 
| Eric Bledsoe (25)
| Giannis Antetokounmpo (13)
| Khris Middleton (8)
| Fiserv Forum17,341
| 11–4
|- style="background:#cfc"
| 16
| November 19
| Denver
| 
| Giannis Antetokounmpo (29)
| Giannis Antetokounmpo (12)
| Giannis Antetokounmpo (6)
| Fiserv Forum17,341
| 12–4
|- style="background:#cfc"
| 17
| November 21
| Portland
| 
| Giannis Antetokounmpo (33)
| Giannis Antetokounmpo (16)
| Giannis Antetokounmpo (9)
| Fiserv Forum17,591
| 13–4
|- style="background:#fcc"
| 18
| November 23
| Phoenix
| 
| Giannis Antetokounmpo (35)
| Giannis Antetokounmpo (10)
| Eric Bledsoe (7)
| Fiserv Forum17,852
| 13–5
|- style="background:#cfc"
| 19
| November 24
| San Antonio
| 
| Giannis Antetokounmpo (34)
| Giannis Antetokounmpo (18)
| Eric Bledsoe (10)
| Fiserv Forum17,559
| 14–5
|- style="background:#fcc"
| 20
| November 26
| @ Charlotte
| 
| Giannis Antetokounmpo (20)
| Giannis Antetokounmpo (13)
| Giannis Antetokounmpo (9)
| Spectrum Center13,805
| 14–6
|- style="background:#cfc"
| 21
| November 28
| Chicago
| 
| Giannis Antetokounmpo (36)
| Giannis Antetokounmpo (11)
| Giannis Antetokounmpo (8)
| Fiserv Forum16,660
| 15–6

|- style="background:#fcc"
| 22
| December 1
| @ New York
| 
| Giannis Antetokounmpo (33)
| Giannis Antetokounmpo (19)
| Antetokounmpo, Bledsoe (7)
| Madison Square Garden19,812
| 15–7
|- style="background:#cfc"
| 23
| December 5
| Detroit
| 
| Eric Bledsoe (27)
| Giannis Antetokounmpo (8)
| Matthew Dellavedova (6)
| Fiserv Forum16,541
| 16–7
|- style="background:#fcc"
| 24
| December 7
| Golden State
| 
| Giannis Antetokounmpo (22)
| Giannis Antetokounmpo (15)
| Giannis Antetokounmpo (5)
| Fiserv Forum17,852
| 16–8
|- style="background:#cfc"
| 25
| December 9
| @ Toronto
| 
| Antetokounmpo, Lopez (19)
| Giannis Antetokounmpo (19)
| Giannis Antetokounmpo (6)
| Scotiabank Arena19,800
| 17–8
|- style="background:#cfc"
| 26
| December 10
| Cleveland
| 
| Eric Bledsoe (20)
| Eric Bledsoe (12)
| Bledsoe, Brogdon (5)
| Fiserv Forum17,155
| 18–8
|- style="background:#fcc"
| 27
| December 12
| @ Indiana
| 
| Eric Bledsoe (26)
| Giannis Antetokounmpo (10)
| Giannis Antetokounmpo (7)
| Bankers Life Fieldhouse17,070
| 18–9
|- style="background:#cfc"
| 28
| December 14
| @ Cleveland
| 
| Giannis Antetokounmpo (44)
| Giannis Antetokounmpo (14)
| Giannis Antetokounmpo (8)
| Quicken Loans Arena19,432
| 19–9
|- style="background:#cfc"
| 29
| December 17
| @ Detroit
| 
| Giannis Antetokounmpo (32)
| Giannis Antetokounmpo (12)
| Eric Bledsoe (9)
| Little Caesars Arena15,051
| 20–9
|- style="background:#cfc"
| 30
| December 19
| New Orleans
| 
| Giannis Antetokounmpo (25)
| D.J. Wilson (10)
| Giannis Antetokounmpo (8)
| Fiserv Forum17,341
| 21–9
|- style="background:#cfc"
| 31
| December 21
| @ Boston
| 
| Giannis Antetokounmpo (30)
| Antetokounmpo, Brogdon (9)
| Antetokounmpo, Middleton (5)
| TD Garden18,624
| 22–9
|- style="background:#fcc"
| 32
| December 22
| @ Miami
| 
| Khris Middleton (18)
| Giannis Antetokounmpo (13)
| Eric Bledsoe (6)
| American Airlines Arena19,600
| 22–10
|- style="background:#cfc"
| 33
| December 25
| @ New York
| 
| Giannis Antetokounmpo (30)
| Giannis Antetokounmpo (14)
| Eric Bledsoe (5)
| Madison Square Garden19,812
| 23–10
|- style="background:#cfc"
| 34
| December 27
| New York
| 
| Giannis Antetokounmpo (31)
| Giannis Antetokounmpo (14)
| Giannis Antetokounmpo (8)
| Fiserv Forum18,058
| 24–10
|- style="background:#cfc"
| 35
| December 29
| Brooklyn
| 
| Giannis Antetokounmpo (31)
| Giannis Antetokounmpo (11)
| Giannis Antetokounmpo (10)
| Fiserv Forum17,913
| 25–10

|- style="background:#cfc"
| 36
| January 1
| Detroit
| 
| Brook Lopez (25)
| Giannis Antetokounmpo (8)
| Giannis Antetokounmpo (7)
| Fiserv Forum17,534
| 26–10
|- style="background:#cfc"
| 37
| January 4
| Atlanta
| 
| Middleton, Brogdon (19)
| Ersan Ilyasova (10)
| Giannis Antetokounmpo (10)
| Fiserv Forum17,632
| 27–10
|- style="background:#fcc"
| 38
| January 5
| Toronto
| 
| Giannis Antetokounmpo (43)
| Giannis Antetokounmpo (18)
| Khris Middleton (9)
| Fiserv Forum18,028
| 27–11
|- style="background:#cfc"
| 39
| January 7
| Utah
| 
| Giannis Antetokounmpo (30)
| Giannis Antetokounmpo (10)
| Eric Bledsoe (6)
| Fiserv Forum17,341
| 28–11
|- style="background:#cfc"
| 40
| January 9
| @ Houston
| 
| Giannis Antetokounmpo (27)
| Giannis Antetokounmpo (21)
| Bledsoe, Antetokounmpo (5)
| Toyota Center18,055
| 29–11
|- style="background:#fcc"
| 41
| January 11
| @ Washington
| 
| Khris Middleton (25)
| Bledsoe, Middleton (8)
| Eric Bledsoe (9)
| Capital One Arena17,966
| 29–12
|- style="background:#cfc"
| 42
| January 13
| @ Atlanta
| 
| Giannis Antetokounmpo (33)
| Khris Middleton (11)
| Eric Bledsoe (10)
| State Farm Arena16,292
| 30–12
|- style="background:#cfc"
| 43
| January 15
| Miami
| 
| Eric Bledsoe (17)
| Giannis Antetokounmpo (10)
| Giannis Antetokounmpo (10)
| Fiserv Forum17,626
| 31–12
|- style="background:#cfc"
| 44
| January 16
| @ Memphis
| 
| Giannis Antetokounmpo (27)
| Giannis Antetokounmpo (11)
| Khris Middleton (5)
| FedExForum14,921
| 32–12
|- style="background:#cfc"
| 45
| January 19
| @ Orlando
| 
| Giannis Antetokounmpo (25)
| Giannis Antetokounmpo (13)
| Giannis Antetokounmpo (5)
| Amway Center18,846
| 33–12
|- style="background:#cfc"
| 46
| January 21
| Dallas
| 
| Giannis Antetokounmpo (31)
| Giannis Antetokounmpo (15)
| Bledsoe, Antetokounmpo (5)
| Fiserv Forum17,963
| 34–12
|- style="background:#cfc"
| 47
| January 25
| Charlotte
| 
| Giannis Antetokounmpo (34)
| Giannis Antetokounmpo (14)
| Khris Middleton (4)
| Fiserv Forum17,803
| 35–12
|- style="background:#fcc"
| 48
| January 27
| @ Oklahoma City
| 
| Giannis Antetokounmpo (27)
| Giannis Antetokounmpo (18)
| Khris Middleton (6)
| Chesapeake Energy Arena18,203
| 35–13
|- style="background:#cfc"
| 49
| January 29
| @ Detroit
| 
| Giannis Antetokounmpo (21)
| Giannis Antetokounmpo (8)
| Giannis Antetokounmpo (11)
| Little Caesars Arena14,187
| 36–13
|- style="background:#cfc"
| 50
| January 31
| @ Toronto
| 
| Giannis Antetokounmpo (19)
| Giannis Antetokounmpo (9)
| Eric Bledsoe (6)
| Scotiabank Arena19,800
| 37–13

|- style="background:#cfc"
| 51
| February 2
| @ Washington
| 
| Giannis Antetokounmpo (37)
| Giannis Antetokounmpo (10)
| Khris Middleton (6)
| Capital One Arena20,409
| 38–13
|- style="background:#cfc"
| 52
| February 4
| @ Brooklyn
| 
| Giannis Antetokounmpo (30)
| Giannis Antetokounmpo (15)
| Giannis Antetokounmpo (9)
| Barclays Center16,209
| 39–13
|- style="background:#cfc"
| 53
| February 6
| Washington
| 
| Giannis Antetokounmpo (43)
| D.J. Wilson (7)
| Eric Bledsoe (11)
| Fiserv Forum17,360
| 40–13
|- style="background:#cfc"
| 54
| February 8
| @ Dallas
| 
| Giannis Antetokounmpo (29)
| Giannis Antetokounmpo (17)
| Bledsoe, Antetokounmpo (5)
| American Airlines Center20,420
| 41–13
|- style="background:#fcc"
| 55
| February 9
| Orlando
| 
| Eric Bledsoe (19)
| Khris Middleton (12)
| Eric Bledsoe (5)
| Fiserv Forum17,812
| 41–14
|- style="background:#cfc"
| 56
| February 11
| @ Chicago
| 
| Giannis Antetokounmpo (29)
| Giannis Antetokounmpo (17)
| Giannis Antetokounmpo (8)
| United Center18,833
| 42–14
|- style="background:#cfc"
| 57
| February 13
| @ Indiana
| 
| Giannis Antetokounmpo (33)
| Giannis Antetokounmpo (19)
| Giannis Antetokounmpo (11)
| Bankers Life Fieldhouse17,311
| 43–14
|- style="background:#cfc"
| 58
| February 21
| Boston
| 
| Giannis Antetokounmpo (30)
| Antetokounmpo, Middleton (13)
| Giannis Antetokounmpo (6)
| Fiserv Forum17,926
| 44–14
|- style="background:#cfc"
| 59
| February 23
| Minnesota
| 
| Khris Middleton (28)
| Giannis Antetokounmpo (10)
| Bledsoe, Antetokounmpo (7)
| Fiserv Forum17,972
| 45–14
|- style="background:#cfc"
| 60
| February 25
| @ Chicago
| 
| Middleton, Brogdon (22)
| D.J. Wilson (8)
| Connaughton, Brogdon (22)
| United Center20,936
| 46–14
|- style="background:#cfc"
| 61
| February 27
| @ Sacramento
| 
| Eric Bledsoe (26)
| Eric Bledsoe (12)
| Eric Bledsoe (13)
| Golden 1 Center17,583
| 47–14

|- style="background:#cfc"
| 62
| March 1
| @ L.A. Lakers
| 
| Khris Middleton (31)
| Giannis Antetokounmpo (15)
| Antetokounmpo, Middleton (6)
| Staples Center18,997
| 48–14
|- style="background:#fcc"
| 63
| March 2
| @ Utah
| 
| Giannis Antetokounmpo (43)
| Giannis Antetokounmpo (14)
| Giannis Antetokounmpo (8)
| Vivint Smart Home Arena18,306
| 48–15
|- style="background:#fcc"
| 64
| March 4
| @ Phoenix
| 
| Giannis Antetokounmpo (21)
| Giannis Antetokounmpo (13)
| Giannis Antetokounmpo (6)
| Talking Stick Resort Arena18,055
| 48–16
|- style="background:#cfc"
| 65
| March 7
| Indiana
| 
| Giannis Antetokounmpo (29)
| Giannis Antetokounmpo (12)
| Giannis Antetokounmpo (5)
| Fiserv Forum17,884
| 49–16
|- style="background:#cfc"
| 66
| March 9
| Charlotte
| 
| Giannis Antetokounmpo (26)
| Giannis Antetokounmpo (13)
| Giannis Antetokounmpo (6)
| Fiserv Forum17,996
| 50–16
|- style="background:#fcc"
| 67
| March 10
| @ San Antonio
| 
| Giannis Antetokounmpo (27)
| Giannis Antetokounmpo (13)
| Antetokounmpo, Bledsoe (6)
| AT&T Center18,594
| 50–17
|- style="background:#cfc"
| 68
| March 12
| @ New Orleans
| 
| Giannis Antetokounmpo (24)
| Giannis Antetokounmpo (9)
| Khris Middleton (7)
| Smoothie King Center15,562
| 51–17
|- style="background:#cfc"
| 69
| March 15
| @ Miami
| 
| Giannis Antetokounmpo (33)
| Giannis Antetokounmpo (16)
| Giannis Antetokounmpo (9)
| American Airlines Arena19,600
| 52–17
|- style="background:#fcc"
| 70
| March 17
| Philadelphia
| 
| Giannis Antetokounmpo (52)
| Giannis Antetokounmpo (16)
| Giannis Antetokounmpo (7)
| Fiserv Forum18,148
| 52–18
|- style="background:#cfc"
| 71
| March 19
| L.A. Lakers
| 
| Khris Middleton (30)
| Khris Middleton (10)
| Eric Bledsoe (7)
| Fiserv Forum17,879
| 53–18
|- style="background:#fcc"
| 72
| March 20
| @ Cleveland
| 
| Khris Middleton (26)
| Khris Middleton (12)
| Eric Bledsoe (8)
| Quicken Loans Arena19,432
| 53–19
|- style="background:#cfc"
| 73
| March 22
| Miami
| 
| Giannis Antetokounmpo (27)
| Pat Connaughton (10)
| Khris Middleton (10)
| Fiserv Forum18,094
| 54–19
|- style="background:#cfc"
| 74
| March 24
| Cleveland
| 
| Giannis Antetokounmpo (26)
| Giannis Antetokounmpo (10)
| Antetokounmpo, Bledsoe (7)
| Fiserv Forum17,930
| 55–19
|- style="background:#cfc"
| 75
| March 26
| Houston
| 
| Eric Bledsoe (23)
| Giannis Antetokounmpo (14)
| Eric Bledsoe (7)
| Fiserv Forum17,910
| 56–19
|- style="background:#cfc"
| 76
| March 28
| L.A. Clippers
| 
| Khris Middleton (39)
| Antetokounmpo, Lopez, Middleton (9)
| Eric Bledsoe (8)
| Fiserv Forum17,922
| 57–19
|- style="background:#fcc"
| 77
| March 31
| @ Atlanta
| 
| Sterling Brown
| Bonzie Colson (16)
| Tim Frazier (15)
| State Farm Arena16,660
| 57–20

|- style="background:#cfc"
| 78
| April 1
| @ Brooklyn
| 
| Eric Bledsoe (29)
| Giannis Antetokounmpo (11)
| Frazier, Bledsoe (7)
| Barclays Center17,732
| 58–20
|- style="background:#cfc"
| 79
| April 4
| @ Philadelphia
| 
| Giannis Antetokounmpo (45)
| Giannis Antetokounmpo (13)
| Giannis Antetokounmpo (6)
| Wells Fargo Center20,701
| 59–20
|- style="background:#fcc"
| 80
| April 6
| Brooklyn
| 
| Eric Bledsoe (33)
| Brook Lopez (8)
| Eric Bledsoe (11)
| Fiserv Forum18,116
| 59–21
|- style="background:#cfc"
| 81
| April 7
| Atlanta
| 
| Giannis Antetokounmpo (30)
| Giannis Antetokounmpo (9)
| Eric Bledsoe (5)
| Fiserv Forum17,775
| 60–21
|- style="background:#fcc"
| 82
| April 10
| Oklahoma City
| 
| Tim Frazier (29)
| D.J. Wilson (17)
| Tim Frazier (13)
| Fiserv Forum18,082
| 60–22

Playoffs

|- style="background:#cfc;"
| 1
| April 14
| Detroit
| 
| Giannis Antetokounmpo (24)
| Giannis Antetokounmpo (17)
| Sterling Brown (7)
| Fiserv Forum17,529
| 1–0
|- style="background:#cfc;"
| 2
| April 17
| Detroit
| 
| Eric Bledsoe (27)
| Giannis Antetokounmpo (12)
| Khris Middleton (8)
| Fiserv Forum17,513
| 2–0
|- style="background:#cfc;"
| 3
| April 20
| @ Detroit
| 
| Khris Middleton (20)
| Giannis Antetokounmpo (10)
| Bledsoe, Hill (5)
| Little Caesars Arena20,520
| 3–0
|- style="background:#cfc;"
| 4
| April 22
| @ Detroit
| 
| Giannis Antetokounmpo (41)
| Sterling Brown (13)
| Sterling Brown (6)
| Little Caesars Arena20,332
| 4–0

|- style="background:#fcc;"
| 1
| April 28
| Boston
| 
| Giannis Antetokounmpo (22)
| Khris Middleton (10)
| Khris Middleton (6)
| Fiserv Forum17,341
| 0–1
|- style="background:#cfc;"
| 2
| April 30
| Boston
| 
| Giannis Antetokounmpo (29)
| Pat Connaughton (11)
| Eric Bledsoe (5)
| Fiserv Forum17,536
| 1–1
|- style="background:#cfc;"
| 3
| May 3
| @ Boston
| 
| Giannis Antetokounmpo (32)
| Giannis Antetokounmpo (13)
| Giannis Antetokounmpo (8)
| TD Garden18,624
| 2–1
|- style="background:#cfc;"
| 4
| May 6
| @ Boston
| 
| Giannis Antetokounmpo (39)
| Giannis Antetokounmpo (16)
| Khris Middleton (7)
| TD Garden18,624
| 3–1
|- style="background:#cfc;"
| 5
| May 8
| Boston
| 
| Giannis Antetokounmpo (20)
| Mirotić, Connaughton (11)
| Giannis Antetokounmpo (8)
| Fiserv Forum17,701
| 4–1

|- style="background:#cfc;"
| 1
| May 15
| Toronto
| 
| Brook Lopez (29)
| Giannis Antetokounmpo (14)
| Giannis Antetokounmpo (6)
| Fiserv Forum17,345
| 1–0
|- style="background:#cfc;"
| 2
| May 17
| Toronto
| 
| Giannis Antetokounmpo (30)
| Giannis Antetokounmpo (17)
| Eric Bledsoe (7)
| Fiserv Forum17,570
| 2–0
|- style="background:#fcc;"
| 3
| May 19
| @ Toronto
| 
| George Hill (24)
| Giannis Antetokounmpo (23)
| Giannis Antetokounmpo (6)
| Scotiabank Arena19,923
| 2–1
|- style="background:#fcc;"
| 4
| May 21
| @ Toronto
| 
| Khris Middleton (30)
| Giannis Antetokounmpo (10)
| Khris Middleton (7)
| Scotiabank Arena20,237
| 2–2
|- style="background:#fcc;"
| 5
| May 23
| Toronto
| 
| Giannis Antetokounmpo (24)
| Malcolm Brogdon (11)
| Khris Middleton (10)
| Fiserv Forum17,384
| 2–3
|- style="background:#fcc;"
| 6
| May 25
| @ Toronto
| 
| Giannis Antetokounmpo (21)
| Giannis Antetokounmpo (11)
| Eric Bledsoe (7)
| Scotiabank Arena20,478
| 2–4

Player statistics

Regular season

|- align="center" bgcolor="#f0f0f0"
| 
| 72 || 72 || 32.8 || .578 || .256 || .729 || 12.5 || 5.9 || 1.3 || 1.5 ||style="background:#274e37;color:#dfd3b0;" |27.7
|- align="center" bgcolor="#f0f0f0"
| 
| 78 || 78 ||29.1||.484||.329||.750||4.6||5.5||1.5||0.4||15.9
|- align="center" bgcolor="#f0f0f0"
| 
| 64 || 64 ||28.6||.505||.426||.928||4.5||3.2||0.7||0.2|| 15.6
|- align="center" bgcolor="#f0f0f0"
| 
| 58 || 7 ||17.8||.465||.361||.690||3.2||1.4||0.4||0.1|| 6.4
|- align="center" bgcolor="#f0f0f0"
| 
| 4 || 0 ||7.8||.333||.400||.000||1.0||0.8||0.0||0.3|| 1.5
|- align="center" bgcolor="#f0f0f0"
|  
| 8 || 2 ||12.3||.333||.238||.889||3.8||0.4||0.6||0.1|| 4.9
|- align="center" bgcolor="#f0f0f0"
| 
| 61 || 2 ||20.7||.466||.330||.725||4.2||2.0||0.5||0.4|| 6.9
|- align="center" bgcolor="#f0f0f0"
|  
| 12 || 0 ||8.1||.316||.364||1.000||0.8||2.4||0.2||0.0|| 1.7
|- align="center" bgcolor="#f0f0f0"
| 
| 27 || 0 ||15.2||.403||.265||.750||2.4||1.1||0.5||0.2|| 4.9
|- align="center" bgcolor="#f0f0f0"
| 
| 3 || 0 || || || || || || || || || 6.4
|- align="center" bgcolor="#f0f0f0"
|  
| 12 || 2 || || || || || || || || || 6.3
|- align="center" bgcolor="#f0f0f0"
|  
| 3 || 0 || || || || || || || || || 1.3
|- align="center" bgcolor="#f0f0f0"
|  
| 14 || 0 || || || || || || || || || 5.6
|- align="center" bgcolor="#f0f0f0"
| 
| 47 || 0 ||20.4||.428||.280||.815||2.6||2.1||0.9||0.1|| 6.8
|- align="center" bgcolor="#f0f0f0"
| 
| 67 || 7 || 18.4 || .438 || .363  || .824 || 4.5 || 0.8 || 0.5  || 0.3 || 6.8
|- align="center" bgcolor="#f0f0f0"
| 
|style="background:#274e37;color:#dfd3b0;" |81 ||style="background:#274e37;color:#dfd3b0;" |81 || || || || || || || || || 12.5
|- align="center" bgcolor="#f0f0f0"
|  
| 35 || 0 || || || || || || || || || 4.7
|- align="center" bgcolor="#f0f0f0"
| 
| 77 || 77 || || || || || || || || || 18.3
|- align="center" bgcolor="#f0f0f0"
|  
| 14 || 3 || || || || || || || || || 11.6
|- align="center" bgcolor="#f0f0f0"
|  
| 4 || 0 || || || || || || || || || 2.5
|- align="center" bgcolor="#f0f0f0"
|  
| 6 || 0 || || || || || || || || || 2.2
|- align="center" bgcolor="#f0f0f0"
| 
| 74 || 12 || || || || || || || || || 6.0
|- align="center" bgcolor="#f0f0f0"
| 
| 48 || 3 || || || || || || || || || 5.8
|- align="center" bgcolor="#f0f0f0"
|  
| 13 || 0 || || || || || || || || || 2.8
|}
  Statistics with the Milwaukee Bucks.

Playoffs

|- align="center" bgcolor="f0f0f0"
| 
| 15 || 15 || || || || || || || || ||style="background:#274e37;color:#dfd3b0;" |25.5
|- align="center" bgcolor="#f0f0f0"
| 
| 15 || 15 || || || || || || || || || 13.7
|- align="center" bgcolor="#f0f0f0"
| 
| 7 || 2 || || || || || || || || || 13.0
|- align="center" bgcolor="#f0f0f0"
| 
| 11 || 5 || || || || || || || || || 4.1
|- align="center" bgcolor="#f0f0f0"
| 
| 15 || 0 || || || || || || || || || 6.2
|- align="center" bgcolor="#f0f0f0"
| 
| 11 || 0 || || || || || || || || || 1.9
|- align="center" bgcolor="#f0f0f0"
| 
| 15 || 0 || || || || || || || || || 11.5
|- align="center" bgcolor="#f0f0f0"
| 
| 15 || 0 || || || || || || || || || 6.8
|- align="center" bgcolor="#f0f0f0"
| 
| 15 || 15 || || || || || || || || || 11.2
|- align="center" bgcolor="#f0f0f0"
| 
| 15 || 15 || || || || || || || || || 16.9
|- align="center" bgcolor="#f0f0f0"
| 
| 14 || 8 || || || || || || || || || 9.5
|- align="center" bgcolor="#f0f0f0"
| 
| 9 || 0 || || || || || || || || || 0.6
|- align="center" bgcolor="#f0f0f0"
| 
| 8 || 0 || || || || || || || || || 2.4
|}

Transactions

Overview

Trades

Free agency

Re-signed

Additions

Subtractions

Awards
 Giannis Antetokounmpo NBA MVP

References

Milwaukee Bucks seasons
Milwaukee Bucks
Milwaukee Bucks
Milwaukee Bucks